Timothy Evald Johnson (born July 22, 1949) is a former professional baseball player and manager. A shortstop and utility infielder in Major League Baseball from 1973 to 1979, he became better known as manager of the Toronto Blue Jays.

Playing career 
After signing with the Los Angeles Dodgers in 1967 as a free agent, Johnson was traded to the Milwaukee Brewers for Rick Auerbach just as the 1973 season began while still a minor leaguer. Johnson played every day for the 1973 Brewers at shortstop, but lost his starting job next season to Robin Yount, thus forcing him to settle in as a utility infielder. He was traded to the Toronto Blue Jays during the 1978 season where he retired a year later with a lifetime .223 batting average in 516 career games.

Scouting, coaching and managerial career 
After retiring as a player, Johnson spent the next 20 years as a scout, coach or minor league manager for the Dodgers, Montreal Expos, Boston Red Sox and Chicago Cubs.

1998 Toronto Blue Jays season 
The Blue Jays named Johnson as their manager for the 1998 season following the firing of Cito Gaston and the interim management of pitching coach Mel Queen. Johnson beat out several higher-profile candidates, most notably Davey Johnson (no relation), Larry Bowa, and Buck Martinez.

Queen remained on as pitching coach under Johnson and the two reportedly feuded extensively, despite Johnson's reputation as a good communicator. Johnson also had rumoured differences with several of his players, including Pat Hentgen, Ed Sprague, and Cy Young Award winner Roger Clemens.

Despite this lack of chemistry, Johnson guided the 1998 Blue Jays to a respectable third-place finish in the AL East with an 88–74 record, just four games out of a tie for the wild card. It was the team's first winning season since they won two World Series in a row in 1992 and 1993.

Vietnam War stories controversy 
This success was partly attributed to the stories Johnson would tell his players about his battle experiences in the Vietnam War. For example, he told Hentgen a story about his war experiences to get him to accept a different place in the pitching rotation.

However, in late November, Johnson told several Toronto newspapers that all of these stories were completely made up. In truth, Johnson had been in the Marine Corps reserves throughout the war, and trained mortarmen at Camp Pendleton while playing in the Dodgers' farm system. He'd also claimed for over 20 years that he'd been an All-American high school basketball player, and turned down a scholarship to attend UCLA.

During the 1998 baseball winter meetings, Johnson said that admitting the truth was like having "a 50,000 pound weight" taken off his shoulders. He said he'd lied because he felt guilty about going to spring training with the Dodgers while many of his friends fought in the war. He entered therapy, and called several of his players to apologize for lying.

Departure from the Blue Jays 
The Blue Jays were initially willing to stand by Johnson and let him return for 1999. During spring training, he apologized to the entire team, and later said that he didn't seem to detect a credibility problem. However, the next month brought a steady diet of questions about Johnson's credibility, as well as outside attacks (Sprague, for instance, called Johnson a "liar" and a "backstabber"). Finally, on March 17, less than a month before opening day, Blue Jays general manager Gord Ash fired Johnson and replaced him with Jim Fregosi. Ash said that Johnson's presence had become so much of a distraction that he felt he would have to fire Johnson "if not now ... 30 or 45 days from now." He decided that he had to act in order to save the season. In the years since Johnson's one season at the helm, the Blue Jays failed to achieve an equal or better record than Johnson's 88–74 mark until 2015. To date, it is Johnson's last job in Major League Baseball.

Managerial record

After MLB 
Following his dismissal from the Blue Jays, Johnson spent seven seasons as manager in the Mexican League, with the Diablos Rojos del México in 1999-2002, Yaquis de Obregón in 2002-2003 and then with the Águilas de Mexicali in 2004-2005.

In 2003, Johnson became manager of the Lincoln Saltdogs of the Northern League. In 2006, the Lincoln team joined the American Association of Independent Professional Baseball. On September 25, 2008, Johnson resigned after six years.  His career record as the Saltdogs' manager was 315–255.

On December 16, 2008, Johnson was announced as the inaugural manager of the Golden Baseball League incarnation of the Tucson Toros.

On November 12, 2010, Johnson was announced as the second manager of the Lake County Fielders of the North American League.

On July 9, 2011, Johnson resigned from his Lake County Fielders Managerial Position

Johnson later became field manager with the El Paso Diablos in 2012, but the team folded in 2013.

Tim coached in the Arizona Winter League as of 2017 and spent time in the California Winter League from 2010–2014 as an instructor and coach. He also coached the Algodoneros de San Luis of the Liga Norte de Mexico later in 2017, before he was promoted to manager of the Pericos de Puebla of the Mexican League on June 4, 2017. Taking over about halfway through the season, Johnson led the Pericos to their second straight championship appearance.

Johnson was named manager of the Tigres de Quintana Roo of the Mexican League for the 2018 season.

Johnson was announced as manager for the Piratas de Campeche of the Mexican League for the 2019 season. However, he was fired 33 games into the season on May 13 after a 10-23 start to the season.

He was hired by the Bravos de León of the Mexican League for the 2020 season. The team posted a 29-37 record and did not make the playoffs. Johnson was dismissed by the team following the season.

References

External links
, or Retrosheet

1949 births
Living people
Albuquerque Dukes players
American expatriate baseball people in Mexico
American expatriate baseball players in Canada
Arizona Instructional League Dodgers players
Bakersfield Dodgers players
Baseball coaches from North Dakota
Baseball players from North Dakota
Boston Red Sox coaches
El Paso Dodgers players
Indianapolis Indians managers
Iowa Cubs managers
Major League Baseball bench coaches
Major League Baseball infielders
Mexican League baseball managers
Milwaukee Brewers players
Milwaukee Brewers scouts
Montreal Expos coaches
Montreal Expos scouts
Northern League (baseball, 1993–2010) managers
Spokane Indians players
Sportspeople from Grand Forks, North Dakota
Toronto Blue Jays managers
Toronto Blue Jays players